The European Journal of Clinical Pharmacology is a peer-reviewed medical journal published by Springer Science+Business Media since 1968. It covers all aspects of clinical pharmacology and drug therapy in humans.

According to the Journal Citation Reports, the journal received a 2014 impact factor of 2.966, ranking it 84th out of 254 journals in the category Pharmacology & Pharmacy.

References 

Pharmacology journals
Publications established in 1968
English-language journals
Monthly journals
Springer Science+Business Media academic journals